The 1996/97 FIS Nordic Combined World Cup was the 14th world cup season, a combination of ski jumping and cross-country skiing organized by FIS. It started on 22 Nov 1996 in Rovaniemi, Finland and ended on 22 March 1997 in Štrbské Pleso, Slovakia.

Calendar

Men

Standings

Overall 

Standings after 12 events.

Nations Cup 

Standings after 12 events.

References

External links
FIS Nordic Combined World Cup 1996/97 

1996 in Nordic combined
1997 in Nordic combined
FIS Nordic Combined World Cup